"Thing About You" is a song written by Tom Petty, and recorded by American rock music group Tom Petty and the Heartbreakers for their 1980 album Hard Promises. In 1985, it was covered by American country music group Southern Pacific, featuring Emmylou Harris, and was released in August 1985 as the second single from the band's self-titled debut album.  The song reached number 14 on the Billboard Hot Country Singles & Tracks chart.

Chart performance

References

1980 songs
1985 singles
Tom Petty songs
Southern Pacific (band) songs
Emmylou Harris songs
Songs written by Tom Petty
Song recordings produced by Jim Ed Norman
Warner Records singles
1985 songs
Vocal collaborations